Agnelo de Souza (born Agnelo Gustavo Adolfo de Souza;  21 January 1869 – 20 November 1927), was a Roman Catholic priest of the Society of the Missionaries of St. Francis Xavier, Pilar who performed missionary work in the province of Goa, then part of Portuguese India. The cause for his canonization has been accepted for investigation by the Holy See, and has progressed to the point that he has been declared Venerable.

Life

Early life 
De Souza was born in the village of Anjuna to Miguel Arcanjo de Souza and Maria Sinforosa Perpetua Magalhães. His parents had nine children, eight sons and a daughter, among whom Agnelo was the sixth child. Even as a small child, all were impressed by his behaviour. From a young age he would remember sermons heard at Mass and would teach doton'n, that is the catechism, to other children, some even older than him. When De Souza was eleven, his parents died suddenly. As his mother was dying, she entrusted her children to the care of Mary, the mother of Jesus.

Seminary 
With the encouragement of an older brother who was already a priest, de Souza pursued a call to the priesthood. He studied philosophy and theology at the Patriarchal Seminary at Rachol. Always in very poor health, he was allowed to live in a private dwelling off the seminary grounds, where he was able to do his studies diligently. He secured the much coveted and singular honor of acessit in his final year of study.

Souza wanted to enter a religious institute, but they had been banned in the lands under the Portuguese Crown since 1835. After much prayer and reflection, de Souza joined the Diocesan Missionary Society of St. Francis Xavier of Pilar on 17 July 1897. He was ordained on 24 September 1898, by the Archbishop of Goa and Patriarch of the East Indies, António Sebastião Valente.

Missionary 
On 8 September 1908, de Souza became a full-fledged member of the Society. His life as a priest took him to Siroda and Sanvordem in Goa, besides Kumta, near Karwar. He was their priest, preacher, confessor and administrator.

Spiritual Director
The then Archbishop of Goa e Damão and Patriarch of the East Indies, Mateus de Oliveira Xavier, appointed de Souza as the Spiritual Director of the Patriarchal Seminary of Rachol on 20 May 1918.

Death and veneration
De Souza died on the feast of the Sacred Heart of Jesus, which was on 20 November in 1927. He collapsed on the pulpit towards the end of the sermon. He insisted on waiting till the Benediction of the Sacred Heart of Jesuswas buried in Rachol. The parish priest who buried him roughly said these words "Hanvem atanch eka Santak matiek laila", which means "I have just laid a Saint to rest." His remains were brought to Pilar on 10 January 1939.

The cause for his canonisation
The process of canonization was begun by the Society with the permission of the Patriarch of Goa in 1947. The second process was presented to the Sacred Congregation of Rites on 5 October 1959. The Sacred Congregation of Rites approved the third process of "De non-cultu" on 27 May 1969. De Souza was declared venerable by the Vatican on 10 November 1986.

A 'feast day' is granted only to the beatified or canonized persons. As de Souza is not yet beatified or canonized like Joseph Vaz or Francis Xavier, he does not have a feast day. De Souza was made a Venerable in 1986, and requires a first-class miracle to be beatified. The vice-postulator for his cause is Hilario Fernandes.

Legacy
Venerable Fr. Agnelo's day is celebrated on 20 November every year, with novenas beginning on 10 November. He is said to have wanted to die on this feast, and God granted his wish.

The hymn Padr Agnel, amchea ixtta (Father Agnel, our friend) was written in his honor, besides Padr Agnelak, Altaracho Man and several others.

A road in Panaji, Goa is named as Father Agnel Road. A road in Gogol, Margao is also named in his honour.

References

External links 
A website with some more information. 
, a website with a lot more information, and many important links.
The Venerable Pilar Father - Fr. Agnelo de Souza at the website Society of the Missionaries of St. Francis Xavier, Pilar
Venerable Agnelo D'Souza, a dedicated website
Venerable Agnelo D'Souza (Fr. Agnelo) - Main Page, a dedicated webpage in Konkani

1869 births
1927 deaths
People from North Goa district
19th-century Indian Roman Catholic priests
20th-century Indian Roman Catholic priests
Roman Catholic missionaries in India
Indian Roman Catholic missionaries
20th-century venerated Christians
Konkani people
Servants of God
Burials in Goa
Christianity in Goa
Venerated Catholics by Pope John Paul II
Scholars from Goa